Palizada  is  a city in  Mexico.

Palizada may also refer to:

Palizada Municipality, Mexico
, Mexico
, a Peruvian waltz (vals criollo)